The first USS Severn was a wooden screw sloop of war in commission in the United States Navy from 1869 to 1871. She was named for Severn River in Maryland.

Severn was laid down as Masholu in October 1864 by the New York Navy Yard, was launched on 22 December 1867 and commissioned on 27 August 1869, Commander Reigart Bolivar Lowry in command.

Service history

Severn called at Key West in January 1871 before cruising among West Indies ports into the following year. In April, she investigated alleged mistreatment of the United States consul at Santiago de Cuba, subsequently returning to Hampton Roads at the end of July. Departing Hampton Roads for Key West in December, Severn returned north to the Boston Navy Yard, decommissioning there on 31 December 1871.

In 1875, following repairs, Severn was transferred to New London, Connecticut. Returning to New York in 1877, Severn was sold on 2 March 1877 to John Roach as part of his compensation for repairs made to the monitor  and broken up.

References
 

 

Sloops of the United States Navy
1867 ships